The Konica San Jose Classic was a golf tournament on the LPGA Tour from 1983 to 1989. It was played at the Almaden Golf & Country Club in San Jose, California.

Winners
Konica San Jose Classic
1989 Beth Daniel
1988 Kathy Guadagnino
1987 Jan Stephenson
1986 Patty Sheehan
1985 Val Skinner

San Jose Classic
1984 Amy Alcott
1983 Kathy Postlewait

References

Former LPGA Tour events
Golf in California
Sports in San Jose, California
Recurring sporting events established in 1983
Recurring sporting events disestablished in 1989
1983 establishments in California
1989 disestablishments in California
Women's sports in California